The Ocean 40 is a sailboat, that was designed by Gary Mull for the yacht charter industry and first built in 1979. It is a development of the Concept 40 and the Kalik 40, both Mull designs.

Production
The boat was built by Kyung-Il Yachts in South Korea, starting in 1979, but is now out of production.

Design
The Ocean 40 is a recreational keelboat, built predominantly of fiberglass. It has a masthead sloop rig, an internally-mounted spade-type rudder and a fixed fin keel. It displaces  and carries  of ballast.

See also
List of sailing boat types

Related development
Concept 40
Kalik 40

References

Keelboats
1970s sailboat type designs
Sailing yachts
Sailboat type designs by Gary Mull
Sailboat types built by Kyung-Il Yacht